The 1957 PGA Championship was the 39th PGA Championship, held July 17–21 at Miami Valley Golf Club in Dayton, Ohio. In the last PGA Championship played under the match play format, Lionel Hebert won 2 & 1 over Dow Finsterwald, who won the following year, the first as a 72-hole stroke play event.

Defending champion Jack Burke Jr. lost in the second round to Milon Marusic, 2 & 1.

At the time, it was not yet known that this was the last at match play, the decision to switch to stroke play was announced during the November meetings.

The Open Championship was held two weeks earlier in Scotland at St Andrews; neither Hebert nor Finsterwald played in 1957 (or ever).

Format
The match play format at the PGA Championship in 1957 called for nine rounds (162 holes) in five days.
As in 1956, the two-day stroke play qualifying segment (36 holes) was eliminated; 128 players were entered in the single-elimination bracket. The PGA Championship had concluded on Tuesday since 1947; this year's schedule was modified for a Sunday final, with match play beginning on Wednesday. The first five rounds were 18-hole matches contested over the first three days, which reduced the field to four players for the weekend. The semifinals and finals were 36-hole matches played on the final two days, Saturday and Sunday.
 Wednesday – first round, 18 holes
 Thursday – second and third rounds, 18 holes each
 Friday – fourth round and quarterfinals, 18 holes each
 Saturday – semifinals – 36 holes
 Sunday – final – 36 holes

Consolation matches at 18 holes were held on the weekend to determine third to eighth places.

Past champions in the field

Final results
Sunday, July 21, 1957

Final eight bracket
In the 18-hole quarterfinals Friday, a clash of the Hebert brothers was avoided when Walter Burkemo defeated Jay Hebert 2&1, while Lionel Hebert defeated Claude Harmon by the same score. On the other side of the bracket, Dow Finsterwald defeated Charles Sheppard, 2 up, and Don Whitt defeated Dick Mayer,  2&1. In the  semifinals on Saturday, Finsterwald defeated Whitt, 2 up, and Hebert prevailed over Burkemo, 3&1.

The final match on Sunday was all-square after the first 18 holes in the morning. Hebert won the first three holes in the afternoon with birdies, but the match was back to all square after thirty holes. Hebert birdied the next three and Finsterwald matched two of them, but then bogeyed the 34th and was two down with two to play; the par-3 35th was halved with pars to end the match. Hebert earned $8,000 for the victory and Finsterwald received $5,000 as runner-up. Burkemo, the 1953 champion, defeated Whitt 3&1 to claim third place and $3,500. Finsterwald captured the title the following year in the new stroke play format; Hebert's older brother Jay won in 1960.

Consolation brackets

Final match scorecards
Morning

Afternoon

Source:

References

External links
PGA Media Guide 2012
PGA.com – 1957 PGA Championship

PGA Championship
Golf in Ohio
Sports competitions in Dayton, Ohio
PGA Championship
PGA Championship
PGA Championship
PGA Championship